Hulu Bernam is a state constituency in Selangor, Malaysia, that has been represented in the Selangor State Legislative Assembly since 1959.

The state constituency was created in the 1958 redistribution and is mandated to return a single member to the Selangor State Legislative Assembly under the first past the post voting system. , the State Assemblyman for Hulu Bernam is Rosni Sohar from Barisan Nasional (BN).

Demographics

History

Polling districts 
According to the federal gazette issued on 30 March 2018, the Hulu Bernam constituency is divided into 15 polling districts.

Representation history

Election results

References

Selangor state constituencies